This is a list of the mammal species recorded in Venezuela. Of the mammal species in Venezuela, one is critically endangered, six are endangered, nineteen are vulnerable, and four are near threatened. One species is classified as extinct.

The following tags are used to highlight each species' conservation status as assessed by the International Union for Conservation of Nature:

Some species were assessed using an earlier set of criteria. Species assessed using this system have the following instead of near threatened and least concern categories:

Subclass: Theria

Infraclass: Metatheria

Order: Didelphimorphia (common opossums)

Didelphimorphia is the order of common opossums of the Western Hemisphere. Opossums probably diverged from the basic South American marsupials in the late Cretaceous or early Paleocene. They are small to medium-sized marsupials, about the size of a large house cat, with a long snout and prehensile tail.

Family: Didelphidae (American opossums)
Subfamily: Caluromyinae
Genus: Caluromys
 Brown-eared woolly opossum, Caluromys lanatus LR/nt
 Bare-tailed woolly opossum, Caluromys philander LR/nt
Subfamily: Didelphinae
Genus: Chironectes
 Water opossum, Chironectes minimus LR/nt
Genus: Didelphis
 White-eared opossum, Didelphis albiventris LR/lc
 Common opossum, Didelphis marsupialis LR/lc
Genus: Gracilinanus
 Wood sprite gracile opossum, Gracilinanus dryas VU
 Northern gracile opossum, Gracilinanus marica LR/nt
Genus: Lutreolina
 Big lutrine opossum, Lutreolina crassicaudata LR/lc
Genus: Marmosa
 Woolly mouse opossum, Marmosa demerarae LR/lc
 Linnaeus's mouse opossum, Marmosa murina LR/lc
 Robinson's mouse opossum, Marmosa robinsoni LR/lc
 Tyler's mouse opossum, Marmosa tyleriana DD
 Guajira mouse opossum, Marmosa xerophila EN
Genus: Marmosops
 Narrow-headed slender opossum, Marmosops cracens EN
 Dusky slender opossum, Marmosops fuscatus LR/nt
 Tschudi's slender opossum, Marmosops impavidus LR/nt
 Delicate slender opossum, Marmosops parvidens LR/nt
Genus: Metachirus
 Brown four-eyed opossum, Metachirus nudicaudatus LR/lc
Genus: Monodelphis
 Northern red-sided opossum, Monodelphis brevicaudata LR/lc
Genus: Philander
 Anderson's four-eyed opossum, Philander andersoni LR/lc
 Gray four-eyed opossum, Philander opossum LR/lc

Order: Paucituberculata (shrew opossums)

There are six extant species of shrew opossum. They are small shrew-like marsupials confined to the Andes.

Family: Caenolestidae
Genus: Caenolestes
 Dusky caenolestid, C. fuliginosus

Infraclass: Eutheria

Order: Sirenia (manatees and dugongs)

Sirenia is an order of fully aquatic, herbivorous mammals that inhabit rivers, estuaries, coastal marine waters, swamps, and marine wetlands. All four species are endangered.

Family: Trichechidae
Genus: Trichechus
 West Indian manatee, Trichechus manatus VU

Order: Cingulata (armadillos)

The armadillos are small mammals with a bony armored shell. They are native to the Americas. There are around 20 extant species.

Family: Dasypodidae (armadillos)
Subfamily: Dasypodinae
Genus: Dasypus
 Greater long-nosed armadillo, Dasypus kappleri LC
 Nine-banded armadillo, Dasypus novemcinctus LC
 Llanos long-nosed armadillo, Dasypus sabanicola LC
Subfamily: Tolypeutinae
Genus: Cabassous
 Northern naked-tailed armadillo, Cabassous centralis DD
 Southern naked-tailed armadillo, Cabassous unicinctus LC
Genus: Priodontes
 Giant armadillo, Priodontes maximus VU

Order: Pilosa (anteaters, sloths and tamanduas)

The order Pilosa is extant only in the Americas and includes the anteaters, sloths, and tamanduas.

Suborder: Folivora
Family: Bradypodidae (three-toed sloths)
Genus: Bradypus
 Pale-throated three-toed sloth, Bradypus tridactylus LC
 Brown-throated three-toed sloth, Bradypus variegatus LC
Family: Choloepodidae (two-toed sloths)
Genus: Choloepus
 Linnaeus's two-toed sloth, Choloepus didactylus LC
 Hoffmann's two-toed sloth, Choloepus hoffmanni LC
Suborder: Vermilingua
Family: Cyclopedidae
Genus: Cyclopes
 Silky anteater, Cyclopes didactylus LC
Family: Myrmecophagidae (American anteaters)
Genus: Myrmecophaga
 Giant anteater, Myrmecophaga tridactyla NT
Genus: Tamandua
 Northern tamandua, Tamandua mexicana LC
 Southern tamandua, Tamandua tetradactyla LC

Order: Primates

The order Primates contains humans and their closest relatives: lemurs, lorisoids, monkeys, and apes.

Suborder: Haplorhini
Infraorder: Simiiformes
Parvorder: Platyrrhini (New World monkeys)
Family: Cebidae
Subfamily: Callitrichinae
Genus: Saguinus
 Red-handed tamarin, Saguinus midas LC
Subfamily: Cebinae
Genus: Cebus
 Humboldt's white-fronted capuchin, Cebus albifrons LC
 Venezuelan brown capuchin, Cebus brunneus LC
 Sierra de Perijá white-fronted capuchin, Cebus leucocephalus
 Weeper capuchin, Cebus olivaceus LC
Genus: Sapajus
 Tufted capuchin, Sapajus apella LC
Genus: Saimiri
 Guianan squirrel monkey, Saimiri sciureus LC
 Humboldt's squirrel monkey, Saimiri cassiquiarensis 
Family: Aotidae
Genus: Aotus
 Three-striped night monkey, Aotus trivirgatus LC
Family: Pitheciidae
Subfamily: Callicebinae
Genus: Callicebus
 Black titi, Callicebus lugens LC
Subfamily: Pitheciinae
Genus: Pithecia
 White-faced saki, Pithecia pithecia LC
Genus: Chiropotes
 Red-backed bearded saki, Chiropotes chiropotes LC
Genus: Cacajao
 Black-headed uakari, Cacajao melanocephalus LC
Family: Atelidae
Subfamily: Alouattinae
Genus: Alouatta
 Venezuelan red howler, Alouatta seniculus LC
Subfamily: Atelinae
Genus: Ateles
 White-fronted spider monkey, Ateles belzebuth VU
 Brown spider monkey, Ateles hybridus CR
 Red-faced spider monkey, Ateles paniscus LC
Genus: Lagothrix
 Brown woolly monkey, Lagothrix lagothricha LR/lc
 Colombian woolly monkey, Lagothrix lugens VU

Order: Rodentia (rodents)

Rodents make up the largest order of mammals, with over 40% of mammalian species. They have two incisors in the upper and lower jaw which grow continually and must be kept short by gnawing.

Suborder: Hystricognathi
Family: Erethizontidae (New World porcupines)
Subfamily: Erethizontinae
Genus: Coendou
 Brazilian porcupine, Coendou prehensilis LR/lc
 Brown hairy dwarf porcupine, Coendou vestitus VU
Family: Dinomyidae (pacarana)
Genus: Dinomys
 Pacarana, Dinomys branickii EN
Family: Caviidae (guinea pigs)
Subfamily: Caviinae
Genus: Cavia
 Brazilian guinea pig, Cavia aperea LR/lc
Subfamily: Hydrochoerinae (capybaras and rock cavies)
Genus: Hydrochoerus
 Capybara, Hydrochoerus hydrochaeris LR/lc
Family: Dasyproctidae (agoutis and pacas)
Genus: Dasyprocta
 Black agouti, Dasyprocta fuliginosa LR/lc
 Orinoco agouti, Dasyprocta guamara LR/lc
 Red-rumped agouti, Dasyprocta leporina LR/lc
 Central American agouti, Dasyprocta punctata LR/lc
Genus: Myoprocta
 Red acouchi, Myoprocta acouchy LR/lc
Family: Cuniculidae
Genus: Cuniculus
 Lowland paca, Cuniculus paca LC
 Mountain paca, Cuniculus taczanowskii NT
Family: Echimyidae
Subfamily: Dactylomyinae
Genus: Olallamys
 Greedy olalla rat, Olallamys edax LR/nt
Subfamily: Echimyinae
Genus: Echimys
 Speckled spiny tree-rat, Echimys semivillosus LR/lc
Genus: Isothrix
 Yellow-crowned brush-tailed rat, Isothrix bistriata LR/nt
Genus: Makalata
 Brazilian spiny tree-rat, Makalata armata LR/lc
Subfamily: Eumysopinae
Genus: Mesomys
 Ferreira's spiny tree-rat, Mesomys hispidus LR/lc
Genus: Proechimys
 Napo spiny rat, Proechimys amphichoricus LR/lc
 Colombian spiny rat, Proechimys canicollis LR/lc
 Guyenne spiny rat, Proechimys cayennensis LR/lc
 Guaira spiny rat, Proechimys guairae LR/lc
 Guyanan spiny rat, Proechimys hoplomyoides LR/lc
 Gray-footed spiny rat, Proechimys poliopus LR/lc
 Napo spiny rat, Proechimys quadruplicatus LR/lc
 Sucre spiny rat, Proechimys urichi LR/lc
Suborder: Sciurognathi
Family: Sciuridae (squirrels)
Subfamily: Sciurinae
Tribe: Sciurini
Genus: Sciurus
 Brazilian squirrel, Sciurus aestuans LR/lc
 Fiery squirrel, Sciurus flammifer LR/lc
 Yellow-throated squirrel, Sciurus gilvigularis LR/lc
 Red-tailed squirrel, Sciurus granatensis LR/lc
 Northern Amazon red squirrel, Sciurus igniventris LR/lc
Family: Heteromyidae
Subfamily: Heteromyinae
Genus: Heteromys
 Trinidad spiny pocket mouse, Heteromys anomalus LR/lc
Family: Cricetidae
Subfamily: Sigmodontinae
Genus: Aepeomys
 Olive montane mouse, Aepeomys lugens LR/lc
Genus: Akodon
 Bogotá grass mouse, Akodon bogotensis LR/lc
 Northern grass mouse, Akodon urichi LR/lc
Genus: Calomys
 Hummelinck's vesper mouse, Calomys hummelincki LR/lc
Genus: Chibchanomys
 Chibchan water mouse, Chibchanomys trichotis LR/nt
Genus: Chilomys
 Colombian forest mouse, Chilomys instans LR/lc
Genus: Holochilus
 Amazonian marsh rat, Holochilus sciureus LR/lc
Genus: Ichthyomys
 Crab-eating rat, Ichthyomys hydrobates LR/nt
 Pittier's crab-eating rat, Ichthyomys pittieri VU
Genus: Melanomys
 Dusky rice rat, Melanomys caliginosus LR/lc
Genus: Microryzomys
 Forest small rice rat, Microryzomys minutus LR/lc
Genus: Neacomys
 Guiana bristly mouse, Neacomys guianae LR/lc
 Common bristly mouse, Neacomys spinosus LR/lc
 Narrow-footed bristly mouse, Neacomys tenuipes LR/lc
Genus: Nectomys
 Trinidad water rat, Nectomys palmipes LR/lc
 Scaly-footed water rat, Nectomys squamipes LR/lc
Genus: Neusticomys
 Musso's fish-eating rat, Neusticomys mussoi EN
 Venezuelan fish-eating rat, Neusticomys venezuelae EN
Genus: Oecomys
 Bicolored arboreal rice rat, Oecomys bicolor LR/lc
 Unicolored arboreal rice rat, Oecomys concolor LR/lc
 Yellow arboreal rice rat, Oecomys flavicans LR/lc
 Brazilian arboreal rice rat, Oecomys paricola LR/lc
 King arboreal rice rat, Oecomys rex LR/lc
 Robert's arboreal rice rat, Oecomys roberti LR/lc
 Red arboreal rice rat, Oecomys rutilus LR/lc
 Savanna arboreal rice rat, Oecomys speciosus LR/lc
 Trinidad arboreal rice rat, Oecomys trinitatis LR/lc
Genus: Oligoryzomys
 Fulvous pygmy rice rat, Oligoryzomys fulvescens LR/lc
 Grayish pygmy rice rat, Oligoryzomys griseolus LR/lc
Genus: Oryzomys
 MacConnell's rice rat, Oryzomys macconnelli LR/lc
 Azara's broad-headed rice rat, Oryzomys megacephalus LR/lc
 Talamancan rice rat, Oryzomys talamancae LR/lc
 Yungas rice rat, Oryzomys yunganus LR/lc
Genus: Rhipidomys
 Coues's climbing mouse, Rhipidomys couesi LR/lc
 Buff-bellied climbing mouse, Rhipidomys fulviventer LR/lc
 MacConnell's climbing mouse, Rhipidomys macconnelli LR/lc
 Atlantic Forest climbing mouse, Rhipidomys mastacalis LR/lc
 Splendid climbing mouse, Rhipidomys nitela LR/lc
 Venezuelan climbing mouse, Rhipidomys venezuelae LR/lc
 Charming climbing mouse, Rhipidomys venustus LR/lc
 Wetzel's climbing mouse, Rhipidomys wetzeli LR/lc
Genus: Sigmodon
 Alston's cotton rat, Sigmodon alstoni LR/lc
 Southern cotton rat, Sigmodon hirsutus LC
Genus: Sigmodontomys
 Alfaro's rice water rat, Sigmodontomys alfari LR/lc
Genus: Thomasomys
 Golden Oldfield mouse, Thomasomys aureus LR/lc
 Woodland Oldfield mouse, Thomasomys hylophilus LR/lc
 Soft-furred Oldfield mouse, Thomasomys laniger LR/lc
 Dressy Oldfield mouse, Thomasomys vestitus LR/lc
Genus: Zygodontomys
 Short-tailed cane rat, Zygodontomys brevicauda LR/lc

Order: Lagomorpha (lagomorphs)

The lagomorphs comprise two families, Leporidae (hares and rabbits), and Ochotonidae (pikas). Though they can resemble rodents, and were classified as a superfamily in that order until the early 20th century, they have since been considered a separate order. They differ from rodents in a number of physical characteristics, such as having four incisors in the upper jaw rather than two.

Family: Leporidae (rabbits, hares)
Genus: Sylvilagus
 Common tapetí, Sylvilagus brasiliensis EN
 Eastern cottontail, Sylvilagus floridanus LR/lc
 Venezuelan lowland rabbit, Sylvilagus varynaensis DD

Order: Eulipotyphla (shrews, hedgehogs, moles, and solenodons)

Eulipotyphlans are insectivorous mammals. Shrews and solenodons closely resemble mice, hedgehogs carry spines, while moles are stout-bodied burrowers.

Family: Soricidae (shrews)
Subfamily: Soricinae
Tribe: Blarinini
Genus: Cryptotis
 Merida small-eared shrew, Cryptotis meridensis LR/lc

Order: Chiroptera (bats)

The bats' most distinguishing feature is that their forelimbs are developed as wings, making them the only mammals capable of flight. Bat species account for about 20% of all mammals.

Family: Noctilionidae
Genus: Noctilio
 Lesser bulldog bat, Noctilio albiventris LR/lc
 Greater bulldog bat, Noctilio leporinus LR/lc
Family: Vespertilionidae
Subfamily: Myotinae
Genus: Myotis
 Silver-tipped myotis, Myotis albescens LR/lc
 Hairy-legged myotis, Myotis keaysi LR/lc
 Curacao myotis, Myotis nesopolus LR/nt
 Black myotis, Myotis nigricans LR/lc
 Montane myotis, Myotis oxyotus LR/lc
 Riparian myotis, Myotis riparius LR/lc
Subfamily: Vespertilioninae
Genus: Eptesicus
 Little black serotine LR/lc
 Brazilian brown bat, Eptesicus brasiliensis LR/lc
 Diminutive serotine, Eptesicus diminutus LR/lc
 Argentine brown bat, Eptesicus furinalis LR/lc
 Big brown bat, Eptesicus fuscus LR/lc
Genus: Histiotus
 Humboldt big-eared brown bat, Histiotus humboldti DD
 Small big-eared brown bat, Histiotus montanus LR/lc
Genus: Lasiurus
 Desert red bat, Lasiurus blossevillii LR/lc
 Hoary bat, Lasiurus cinereus LR/lc
 Southern yellow bat, Lasiurus ega LR/lc
Genus: Rhogeessa
 Tiny yellow bat, Rhogeessa minutilla LR/nt
Family: Molossidae
Genus: Cynomops
 Cinnamon dog-faced bat, Cynomops abrasus LR/nt
 Greenhall's dog-faced bat, Cynomops greenhalli LR/lc
 Southern dog-faced bat, Cynomops planirostris LR/lc
Genus: Eumops
 Dwarf bonneted bat, Eumops bonariensis LR/lc
 Big bonneted bat, Eumops dabbenei LR/lc
 Wagner's bonneted bat, Eumops glaucinus LR/lc
 Sanborn's bonneted bat, Eumops hansae LR/lc
 Western mastiff bat, Eumops perotis LR/lc
Genus: Molossops
 Mato Grosso dog-faced bat, Molossops mattogrossensis LR/nt
 Rufous dog-faced bat, Molossops neglectus LR/nt
 Dwarf dog-faced bat, Molossops temminckii LR/lc
Genus: Molossus
 Bonda mastiff bat, Molossus bondae LR/lc
 Coiban mastiff bat, Molossus coibensis LR/nt
 Velvety free-tailed bat, Molossus molossus LR/lc
 Miller's mastiff bat, Molossus pretiosus LR/lc
 Sinaloan mastiff bat, Molossus sinaloae LR/lc
Genus: Nyctinomops
 Peale's free-tailed bat, Nyctinomops aurispinosus LR/lc
 Broad-eared bat, Nyctinomops laticaudatus LR/lc
 Big free-tailed bat, Nyctinomops macrotis LR/lc
Genus: Promops
 Big crested mastiff bat, Promops centralis LR/lc
 Brown mastiff bat, Promops nasutus LR/lc
Genus: Tadarida
 Mexican free-tailed bat, Tadarida brasiliensis LR/nt
Family: Emballonuridae
Genus: Centronycteris
 Shaggy bat, Centronycteris maximiliani LR/lc
Genus: Cormura
 Wagner's sac-winged bat, Cormura brevirostris LR/lc
Genus: Diclidurus
 Greater ghost bat, Diclidurus ingens VU
 Isabelle's ghost bat, Diclidurus isabella LR/nt
 Lesser ghost bat, Diclidurus scutatus LR/lc
Genus: Peropteryx
 Greater dog-like bat, Peropteryx kappleri LR/lc
 White-winged dog-like bat, Peropteryx leucoptera LR/lc
 Lesser doglike bat, Peropteryx macrotis LR/lc
Genus: Rhynchonycteris
 Proboscis bat, Rhynchonycteris naso LR/lc
Genus: Saccopteryx
 Greater sac-winged bat, Saccopteryx bilineata LR/lc
 Frosted sac-winged bat, Saccopteryx canescens LR/lc
 Amazonian sac-winged bat, Saccopteryx gymnura VU
 Lesser sac-winged bat, Saccopteryx leptura LR/lc
Family: Mormoopidae
Genus: Mormoops
 Ghost-faced bat, Mormoops megalophylla LR/lc
Genus: Pteronotus
 Naked-backed bat, Pteronotus davyi LR/lc
 Big naked-backed bat, Pteronotus gymnonotus LR/lc
 Parnell's mustached bat, Pteronotus parnellii LR/lc
 Wagner's mustached bat, Pteronotus personatus LR/lc
Family: Phyllostomidae
Subfamily: Phyllostominae
Genus: Glyphonycteris
 Davies's big-eared bat, Glyphonycteris daviesi LR/nt
 Tricolored big-eared bat, Glyphonycteris sylvestris LR/nt
Genus: Lampronycteris
 Yellow-throated big-eared bat, Lampronycteris brachyotis LR/lc
Genus: Lonchorhina
 Tomes's sword-nosed bat, Lonchorhina aurita LR/lc
 Fernandez's sword-nosed bat, Lonchorhina fernandezi VU
 Northern sword-nosed bat, Lonchorhina inusitata DD
 Orinoco sword-nosed bat, Lonchorhina orinocensis LR/nt
Genus: Lophostoma
 Pygmy round-eared bat, Lophostoma brasiliense LR/lc
 Carriker's round-eared bat, Lophostoma carrikeri VU
 White-throated round-eared bat, Lophostoma silvicolum LR/lc
Genus: Macrophyllum
 Long-legged bat, Macrophyllum macrophyllum LR/lc
Genus: Micronycteris
 Hairy big-eared bat, Micronycteris hirsuta LR/lc
 Little big-eared bat, Micronycteris megalotis LR/lc
 White-bellied big-eared bat, Micronycteris minuta LR/lc
 Schmidts's big-eared bat, Micronycteris schmidtorum LR/lc
Genus: Mimon
 Striped hairy-nosed bat, Mimon crenulatum LR/lc
Genus: Phylloderma
 Pale-faced bat, Phylloderma stenops LR/lc
Genus: Phyllostomus
 Pale spear-nosed bat, Phyllostomus discolor LR/lc
 Lesser spear-nosed bat, Phyllostomus elongatus LR/lc
 Greater spear-nosed bat, Phyllostomus hastatus LR/lc
Genus: Tonatia
 Stripe-headed round-eared bat, Tonatia saurophila LR/lc
Genus: Trachops
 Fringe-lipped bat, Trachops cirrhosus LR/lc
Genus: Trinycteris
 Niceforo's big-eared bat, Trinycteris nicefori LR/lc
Genus: Vampyrum
 Spectral bat, Vampyrum spectrum LR/nt
Subfamily: Lonchophyllinae
Genus: Lionycteris
 Chestnut long-tongued bat, Lionycteris spurrelli LR/lc
Genus: Lonchophylla
 Orange nectar bat, Lonchophylla robusta LR/lc
 Thomas's nectar bat, Lonchophylla thomasi LR/lc
Subfamily: Glossophaginae
Genus: Anoura
 Tailed tailless bat, Anoura caudifer LR/lc
 Handley's tailless bat, Anoura cultrata LR/lc
 Geoffroy's tailless bat, Anoura geoffroyi LR/lc
 Broad-toothed tailless bat, Anoura latidens LR/nt
 Luis Manuel's tailless bat, Anoura luismanueli DD
Genus: Choeroniscus
 Godman's long-tailed bat, Choeroniscus godmani LR/nt
 Minor long-nosed long-tongued bat, Choeroniscus minor LR/lc
Genus: Glossophaga
 Miller's long-tongued bat, Glossophaga longirostris LR/lc
 Pallas's long-tongued bat, Glossophaga soricina LR/lc
Genus: Leptonycteris
 Southern long-nosed bat, Leptonycteris curasoae VU
Genus: Lichonycteris
 Dark long-tongued bat, Lichonycteris obscura LR/lc
Genus: Scleronycteris
 Ega long-tongued bat, Scleronycteris ega VU
Subfamily: Carolliinae
Genus: Carollia
 Chestnut short-tailed bat, Carollia castanea LR/lc
 Seba's short-tailed bat, Carollia perspicillata LR/lc
Genus: Rhinophylla
 Dwarf little fruit bat, Rhinophylla pumilio LR/lc
Subfamily: Stenodermatinae
Genus: Ametrida
 Little white-shouldered bat, Ametrida centurio LR/lc
Genus: Artibeus
 Large fruit-eating bat, Artibeus amplus LR/nt
 Gervais's fruit-eating bat, Artibeus cinereus LR/lc
 Brown fruit-eating bat, Artibeus concolor LR/nt
 Great fruit-eating bat, Artibeus intermedius LR/lc
 Jamaican fruit bat, Artibeus jamaicensis LR/lc
 Great fruit-eating bat, Artibeus lituratus LR/lc
 Dark fruit-eating bat, Artibeus obscurus LR/nt
 Pygmy fruit-eating bat, Artibeus phaeotis LR/lc
 Flat-faced fruit-eating bat, Artibeus planirostris LR/lc
Genus: Centurio
 Wrinkle-faced bat, Centurio senex LR/lc
Genus: Chiroderma
 Salvin's big-eyed bat, Chiroderma salvini LR/lc
 Little big-eyed bat, Chiroderma trinitatum LR/lc
 Hairy big-eyed bat, Chiroderma villosum LR/lc
Genus: Enchisthenes
 Velvety fruit-eating bat, Enchisthenes hartii LR/lc
Genus: Mesophylla
 MacConnell's bat, Mesophylla macconnelli LR/lc
Genus: Sphaeronycteris
 Visored bat, Sphaeronycteris toxophyllum LR/lc
Genus: Sturnira
 Aratathomas's yellow-shouldered bat, Sturnira aratathomasi LR/nt
 Bidentate yellow-shouldered bat, Sturnira bidens LR/nt
 Bogota yellow-shouldered bat, Sturnira bogotensis LR/lc
 Hairy yellow-shouldered bat, Sturnira erythromos LR/lc
 Little yellow-shouldered bat, Sturnira lilium LR/lc
 Highland yellow-shouldered bat, Sturnira ludovici LR/lc
 Tilda's yellow-shouldered bat, Sturnira tildae LR/lc
Genus: Uroderma
 Tent-making bat, Uroderma bilobatum LR/lc
 Brown tent-making bat, Uroderma magnirostrum LR/lc
Genus: Vampyressa
 Bidentate yellow-eared bat, Vampyressa bidens LR/nt
 Southern little yellow-eared bat, Vampyressa pusilla LR/lc
Genus: Vampyrodes
 Great stripe-faced bat, Vampyrodes caraccioli LR/lc
Genus: Platyrrhinus
 Eldorado broad-nosed bat, Platyrrhinus aurarius LR/nt
 Short-headed broad-nosed bat, Platyrrhinus brachycephalus LR/lc
 Heller's broad-nosed bat, Platyrrhinus helleri LR/lc
 Shadowy broad-nosed bat, Platyrrhinus umbratus LR/nt
 Greater broad-nosed bat, Platyrrhinus vittatus LR/lc
Subfamily: Desmodontinae
Genus: Desmodus
 Common vampire bat, Desmodus rotundus LR/lc
Genus: Diaemus
 White-winged vampire bat, Diaemus youngi LR/lc
Genus: Diphylla
 Hairy-legged vampire bat, Diphylla ecaudata LR/nt
Family: Furipteridae
Genus: Furipterus
 Furipteridae, Furipterus horrens LR/lc
Family: Thyropteridae
Genus: Thyroptera
 Peters's disk-winged bat, Thyroptera discifera LR/lc
 Spix's disk-winged bat, Thyroptera tricolor LR/lc

Order: Cetacea (whales)

The order Cetacea includes whales, dolphins and porpoises. They are the mammals most fully adapted to aquatic life with a spindle-shaped nearly hairless body, protected by a thick layer of blubber, and forelimbs and tail modified to provide propulsion underwater.

Suborder: Mysticeti
Family: Balaenopteridae (baleen whales)
Genus: Balaenoptera 
 Common minke whale, Balaenoptera acutorostrata
 Sei whale, Balaenoptera borealis
 Bryde's whale, Balaenoptera brydei
 Blue whale, Balaenoptera musculus
Genus: Megaptera
 Humpback whale, Megaptera novaeangliae
Suborder: Odontoceti
Superfamily: Platanistoidea
Family: Delphinidae (marine dolphins)
Genus: Delphinus
 Short-beaked common dolphin, Delphinus delphis DD
Genus: Feresa
 Pygmy killer whale, Feresa attenuata DD
Genus: Globicephala
 Short-finned pilot whale, Globicephala macrorhyncus DD
Genus: Lagenodelphis
 Fraser's dolphin, Lagenodelphis hosei DD
Genus: Grampus
 Risso's dolphin, Grampus griseus DD
Genus: Orcinus
 Killer whale, Orcinus orca DD
Genus: Peponocephala
 Melon-headed whale, Peponocephala electra DD
Genus: Pseudorca
 False killer whale, Pseudorca crassidens DD
Genus: Sotalia
 Guiana dolphin, Sotalia guianensis DD
 Tucuxi, Sotalia fluviatilis DD
 Amazon river dolphin, Sotalia geoffrensis DD
Genus: Stenella
 Pantropical spotted dolphin, Stenella attenuata DD
 Clymene dolphin, Stenella clymene DD
 Striped dolphin, Stenella coeruleoalba DD
 Atlantic spotted dolphin, Stenella frontalis DD
 Spinner dolphin, Stenella longirostris DD
Genus: Steno
 Rough-toothed dolphin, Steno bredanensis DD
Genus: Tursiops
 Common bottlenose dolphin, Tursiops truncatus
Family: Physeteridae (sperm whales)
Genus: Physeter
 Sperm whale, Physeter catodon DD
Family: Kogiidae (dwarf sperm whales)
Genus: Kogia
 Pygmy sperm whale, Kogia breviceps DD
 Dwarf sperm whale, Kogia sima DD
Superfamily Ziphioidea
Family: Ziphidae (beaked whales)
Genus: Mesoplodon
 Gervais' beaked whale, Mesoplodon europaeus DD)
Genus: Ziphius
 Cuvier's beaked whale, Ziphius cavirostris DD

Order: Carnivora (carnivorans)

There are over 260 species of carnivorans, the majority of which feed primarily on meat. They have a characteristic skull shape and dentition.

Suborder: Feliformia
Family: Felidae (cats)
Subfamily: Felinae
Genus: Herpailurus
Jaguarundi, H. yagouaroundi 
Genus: Leopardus
Ocelot L. pardalis 
Oncilla L. tigrinus 
Margay L. wiedii 
Genus: Puma
Cougar, P. concolor 
Subfamily: Pantherinae
Genus: Panthera
Jaguar, P. onca 
Suborder: Caniformia
Family: Canidae (dogs, foxes)
Genus: Cerdocyon
 Crab-eating fox, Cerdocyon thous LC
Genus: Speothos
 Bush dog, Speothos venaticus VU
Genus: Urocyon
 Gray fox, Urocyon cinereoargenteus LC
Family: Ursidae (bears)
Genus: Tremarctos
 Spectacled bear, Tremarctos ornatus VU
Family: Procyonidae (raccoons)
Genus: Bassaricyon
 Eastern lowland olingo, Bassaricyon alleni
Genus: Nasua
 South American coati, Nasua nasua
Genus: Nasuella
 Mountain coati, Nasuella olivacea DD
Genus: Potos
 Kinkajou, Potos flavus
Genus: Procyon
 Crab-eating raccoon, Procyon cancrivorus
Family: Mustelidae (mustelids)
Genus: Eira
 Tayra, Eira barbara
Genus: Galictis
 Greater grison, Galictis vittata
Genus: Lontra
 Neotropical river otter, Lontra longicaudis NT
Genus: Neogale
 Long-tailed weasel, Neogale frenata
Genus: Pteronura
 Giant otter, Pteronura brasiliensis EN
Family: Mephitidae
Genus: Conepatus
 Striped hog-nosed skunk, Conepatus semistriatus
Suborder: Pinnipedia
Family: Phocidae (earless seals)
Genus: Neomonachus
Caribbean monk seal, Neomonachus tropicalis EX

Order: Perissodactyla (odd-toed ungulates)

The odd-toed ungulates are browsing and grazing mammals. They are usually large to very large, and have relatively simple stomachs and a large middle toe.

Family: Tapiridae (tapirs)
Genus: Tapirus
 Lowland tapir, T. pinchaque EN extirpated
 Brazilian tapir, T. terrestris VU

Order: Artiodactyla (even-toed ungulates)

The even-toed ungulates are ungulates whose weight is borne about equally by the third and fourth toes, rather than mostly or entirely by the third as in perissodactyls. There are about 220 artiodactyl species, including many that are of great economic importance to humans.

Family: Cervidae (deer)
Subfamily: Capreolinae
Genus: Mazama
 Red brocket, Mazama americana DD
 Gray brocket, Mazama gouazoupira DD
 Little red brocket, Mazama rufina LR/nt
Genus: Odocoileus
 White-tailed deer, Odocoileus virginianus LR/lc
Family: Tayassuidae (peccaries)
Genus: Dicotyles
 Collared peccary, D. tajacu LC
Genus: Tayassu
 White-lipped peccary, Tayassu pecari NT

See also
List of chordate orders
Lists of mammals by region
List of prehistoric mammals
Mammal classification
List of mammals described in the 2000s
Other lists of fauna of Venezuela
 List of echinoderms of Venezuela
 List of Poriferans of Venezuela
 List of introduced molluscs of Venezuela
 List of marine molluscs of Venezuela
 List of molluscs of Falcón state, Venezuela
 List of non-marine molluscs of El Hatillo Municipality, Miranda, Venezuela
 List of non-marine molluscs of Venezuela
 List of birds of Venezuela

References

External links

Venezuela
Mammals
List
Venezuela